Ester Uzoukwu is a Nigerian taekwondo practitioner who competes in the women's senior category. She won a silver medal at the 2015 All-Africa Games in the 73 kg category.

Sports career 
Ester Uzoukwu won a silver medal at the 2015 All-Africa Games held in Brazzaville, Republic of the Congo. She participated in the 73 kg event.

References 
Esther Uzoukwu at taekwondodata.com

Living people
Year of birth missing (living people)
Nigerian female taekwondo practitioners
Competitors at the 2015 African Games
Place of birth missing (living people)
African Games silver medalists for Nigeria
African Games medalists in taekwondo